Hong Kong competed at the 2015 World Aquatics Championships in Kazan, Russia from 24 July to 9 August 2015.

Open water swimming

Hong Kong has qualified four swimmers to compete in the open water marathon.

Swimming

Hong Kong swimmers have achieved qualifying standards in the following events (up to a maximum of 2 swimmers in each event at the A-standard entry time, and 1 at the B-standard):

Men

Women

Synchronized swimming

Hong Kong fielded a full team of ten synchronized swimmers to compete in each of the following events.

Women

References

External links
HKASA website

Nations at the 2015 World Aquatics Championships
2015 in Hong Kong sport
Hong Kong at the World Aquatics Championships